Bangarmau is a constituency of the Uttar Pradesh Legislative Assembly covering the city of Bangarmau in the Unnao district of Uttar Pradesh, India.

Bangarmau is one of six assembly constituencies in the Unnao Lok Sabha constituency. Since 2008, this assembly constituency is numbered 162 amongst 403 constituencies.

This seat belonged to candidate Kuldeep Singh Sengar who won in last Assembly election for the 4th time of 2017 Uttar Pradesh Legislative Elections defeating Samajwadi Party candidate Badaloo Khan by a margin of 28,237 votes.

Members of Vidhan Sabha 
 2002 : Ram Shankar Pal (Bahujan Samaj Party)
 2007 : Kuldeep Singh Sengar (Samajwadi Party)
 2012 : Badlu Khan Samajwadi Party
 2017 : Kuldeep Singh Sengar (BJP)
 2020 : Shrikant Katiyar (BJP) By-Election
 2022 : Shrikant Katiyar (Bharatiya Janata Party)

Election results

2022

2017

References

External links
 

Assembly constituencies of Uttar Pradesh
Unnao district